Themistocles Popa (27 June 1921 – 26 November 2013) was a Romanian composer, musician, and film actor.

Life
Temistocle Popa studied flute, harp, and saxophone at the National University of Music Bucharest. Beginning in the early 1960s, he wrote music for many Romanian films.

He was married to actress Cornelia Teodosiu, and resided with her in Bucharest. After the Romanian Revolution of 1989 Popa lost almost his entire fortune due to nationalization of assets.

In 2004 he received the Romanian National Order Legal Service, attaining the rank of Knight.

Popa died in 2013 and was buried at Ghencea Military Cemetery in Bucharest.

List of film scores
 Kingdom in the Clouds (1969)
 Songs of the Sea (1971)
 Astă seară dansăm în familie (1972)
 Sfînta Tereza și diavolii (1972) 
 Veronica (1972)
 Cu mîinile curate (1972) 
 Ultimul cartuș (1973)  
 Veronica se întoarce (1973)
 Tată de duminică (1975)
 Singurătatea florilor (1976) 
 Premiera (1976)
 Roșcovanul (1976)
 Eu, tu, și... Ovidiu (1978)
 Melodii, melodii (1978) 
 Secretul lui Bachus (1984)
 Zbor periculos (1984)
 Căsătorie cu repetiție (1985)
 Secretul lui Nemesis (1987)
 Duminică în familie (1988)

Books
 Trecea fanfara militară (1989).

References

External links
Partial Discography

1921 births
2013 deaths
People from Galați
Romanian composers
Romanian male actors
Burials at Ghencea Cemetery
National University of Music Bucharest alumni